Tojo Una-Una Regency is a regency of Central Sulawesi, Indonesia. The administrative centre is at Ampana town, on the Sulawesi 'mainland'. While the Regency includes a considerable area on the eastern peninsula of Sulawesi, it also includes the Togian Islands in the Gulf of Tomini. The total area covers 5,721.51 km2 and the population was 134,945 at the 2010 Census and 163,829 at the 2020 Census; the official estimate as at mid 2021 was 166,339.

History
In 1999, Tojo Una-Una Regency was created out of the eastern portion of Poso Regency.

Administration 
At the time of the 2010 Census, the Tojo Una-Una Regency was divided into nine districts (kecamatan). Subsequent to 2010, three additional districts have been created - Batudaka, Ratolindo and Talatako. These are tabulated below with their areas and their 2010 and 2020 Census populations, together with the official estimate as at mid 2021.  The table also includes the locations of the district administrative centres, the number of villages (rural desa and urban kelurahan) in each district, and its post code.

Notes:(a) The 2010 Census population of Ratolindo district is included in the figure for Ampana Kota district, from which it was cut out.(b) The 2010 Census population of Batudaka district is included in the figure for Una-Una district, from which it was cut out.(c) The 2010 Census population of Talatako district is included in the figure for Walea Kepulauan district, from which it was cut out.

Dive sites
The best place to do diving is Una Una volcano island.

Based on Badan Koordinasi Survei dan Pemetaan Nasional (Bakosurtanal) or Coordinating Agency for Surveys and Mapping, there are 33 dive sites disperses from north to south beaches of the Togian Islands with fringing reefs, barrier reefs, patch reefs and atolls. The area has the third most biodiversity in the world and is a series of Bunaken National Marine Park and Raja Ampat Islands.

References

External links
 Official website of Tojo Una-Una Regency

Regencies of Central Sulawesi